Brij Bihari Tandon, is a retired Indian Administrative Service officer of 1965 batch belonging to the Himachal Pradesh cadre, who served as 14th Chief Election Commissioner of India from 16 May 2005 till 29 June 2006.

He joined as Election commissioner in June 2001.

Currently he is serving as Independent director in Filatex India Pvt Ltd

External links

 New article dated 25-April-2005

Chief Election Commissioners of India
Living people
Year of birth missing (living people)
Indian Administrative Service officers